Voivode is a Slavic term for a military commander or a governor of a voivodeship.

Voivode, or variants, may also refer to:
 The Voyevoda (opera), an opera by Pyotr Tchaikovsky
 Voivod (band), a Canadian metal band
 Voivod (album), an album by Voivod
 R-36M2 "Voyevoda", a modification of the Russian missile R-36
 The Voyevoda (symphonic ballad), a composition by Pyotr Ilyich Tchaikovsky
Wojewoda (film), a 1912 Polish silent film
Voivoda, Greece (disambiguation), several Greek places

People with the surname
Alexey Voyevoda (born 1980), Russian bobsledder and armwrestler
Dávid Vojvoda (born 1990), Hungarian basketball player
Juan Pablo Vojvoda (born 1975), Argentine football manager
Malesija Vojvoda (born 1970), Montenegrin football player and manager
Mërgim Vojvoda (born 1995), Kosovo Albanian footballer
Michael Phillip Wojewoda, Canadian record producer and musician